Lanneuffret is a commune in the Finistère department of Brittany in north-western France.

Population
Inhabitants of Lanneuffret are called in French Lanneuffretois.

See also
Communes of the Finistère department
Lanneuffret Parish close
List of the works of the Maître de Plougastel

References

External links
Official website 
Mayors of Finistère Association 

Communes of Finistère